Chrysoritis cotrelli is a species of butterfly in the family Lycaenidae. It is endemic to Eastern Cape and Western Cape of South Africa. It is mostly considered a subspecies of Chrysoritis zeuxo.

References

Sources

Chrysoritis
Butterflies described in 1975
Endemic butterflies of South Africa
Taxonomy articles created by Polbot